Whybrow is a surname. Notable people with the surname include:

Arthur Whybrow (1923–2009), British actor
Ian Whybrow (born 1941), English writer
Peter C. Whybrow (born 1939), English psychiatrist and writer

See also
Wybrow

English-language surnames